Is Raat Ki Subah Nahin is a 1996 Indian Hindi-language thriller film directed by Sudhir Mishra. The film stars Tara Deshpande and Nirmal Pandey, with the entire plot taking place over a single night. The film is based on a story written by Sudhir Mishra's brother, Sudhanshu Mishra, who died in 1995.<ref>{{Cite web|url=https://www.indiatvnews.com/entertainment/celebrities/sudhir-mishra-on-25-years-of-is-raat-ki-subah-nahin-wish-i-could-do-director-s-cut-of-the-film-710070|title=Sudhir Mishra on 25 years of Is Raat Ki Subah Nahin: Wish I could do directors cut of the film|first=Parina|last=Taneja|date=8 June 2021|website=www.indiatvnews.com}}</ref>

In 2011, Sudir Mishra launched a spiritual sequel to Is Raat Ki Subah Nahin, titled Yeh Saali Zindagi, with Arunoday Singh, Irrfan Khan and Chitrangada Singh.

 Plot 
An advertising executive, Aditya (Nirmal Pandey) has a beautiful wife, Pooja (Tara Deshpande) and a beautiful mistress, Malvika (Smriti Mishra). This secret affair is the catalyst for much of the plot. Adi gets into a scuffle with a bunch of gangsters led by Ramanbhai, (Ashish Vidyarthi). To add to the tension, Ramanbhai is under duress because his colleague, Vilas Pandey (Saurabh Shukla) is after his life.

A small-scale gang war erupts in the city: A cop Inspector Patankar (Ganesh Yadav) is changing sides faster than a chameleon, a rival gang lord Prafulla Kalia (Virendra Saxena) is offering deals and — in the middle of all this — Aditya finds himself stuck. A fast-paced sequence of events happen in the span of one single night.

 Cast 
 Nirmal Pandey as Aditya
 Tara Deshpande as Pooja
 Smriti Mishra as Malvika
 Manoj Pahwa as Rajesh
 Saurabh Shukla as Vilas Pandey
 Ashish Vidyarthi as Ramanbhai
 Seema Bhargava as Ramanbhai's sister
 Johnny Lever in a guest role
 Deepak Qazir as Vilas's accomplice
 Virendra Saxena as Prafulla Kalia
 Sandeep Kulkarni as Shankar
 Kishore Kadam as Ganya
 Ganesh Yadav as Inspector Patankar
 Murad Ali as Chhotu, Ramanbhai's so-called younger brother
 R. Madhavan as the club singer in the song "Chup Tum Raho"
 Akhil Mishra as the Neighbour

Soundtrack

The soundtrack includes the following tracks and instrumentals, composed by M. M. Kreem, with lyrics by Nida Fazli, who received a Filmfare Best Lyricist Award Nomination for "Jeevan Kya Hai." Background music was by Salim–Sulaiman.

 Critical reception Is Raat Ki Subah Nahin features in Avijit Ghosh's book, 40 Retakes: Bollywood Classics You May Have Missed''. "Violent and sensuous, opaque and funny, the movie creates the Bollywood mafia stylebook," Ghosh writes.

Awards 
 1996: Star Screen Award: Best Editing: Renu Saluja
 1996: Bengal Film Journalists' Association Awards: Best Actor Award (Hindi): Ashish Vidyarthi
 1997: Star Screen Award for Best Villain: Ashish Vidyarthi

References

External links 
 
 Is Raat Ki Subah Nahin (1996) at Bollywood Hungama

1996 films
1990s Hindi-language films
Indian crime thriller films
1996 crime thriller films
Indian gangster films
Films set in Mumbai
Films scored by M. M. Keeravani
Films directed by Sudhir Mishra